Jani Paasonen (born 11 April 1975) is a Finnish rally driver. He used to compete in the World Rally Championship (WRC) with Škoda Motorsport. His best result was 6th place at Rally Finland 2004 with Škoda Fabia WRC.

WRC results

Complete FIA World Rallycross Championship results
(key)

Supercar

References

1975 births
Living people
People from Mäntyharju
Finnish rally drivers
World Rally Championship drivers
World Rallycross Championship drivers
Sportspeople from South Savo
Škoda Motorsport drivers